Silvina Knight is an American make-up artist. She won two Primetime Emmy Awards and was nominated for twelve more in the category Outstanding Makeup. Her two wins were for the television programs American Horror Story and American Crime Story.

References

External links 

Living people
Year of birth missing (living people)
Place of birth missing (living people)
American make-up artists
Primetime Emmy Award winners
20th-century American women
21st-century American women